Flying Gold (Hungarian: Repülő arany) is a 1932 Hungarian crime film directed by Steve Sekely and starring Steven Geray, Gyula Kabos and Lajos Gárday. A shipment of gold being flown from Paris to Budapest is robbed in mid-air. A French-language version  was also released.

Cast
  Steven Geray - Bálint György, az Esti Hírek újságírója 
  Gyula Kabos - Cadar, francia riporter  
  Lajos Gárday - Bandita  
 Emmi Buttykay - Bálint ismerõse  
  László Dezsõffy - Szállodai detektív  
  Lajos Gellért - Hubner  
  Sándor Góth - Báthory, rendõrtanácsos  
  Gyula Justh - Portás  
  Gyözö Kabók  - Parasztember  
  László Keleti - Kínai péklegény  
  Gábor Kertész    
  Zoltán Makláry - Tisztviselõ  
  Zoltán Pethö - Pilóta  
  Blanca Valery - Sonja Grygorine  
  Éva Vass - Báthory lánya

References

Bibliography
 Paris, Michael. From the Wright Brothers to Top Gun: Aviation, Nationalism, and Popular Cinema. Manchester University Press, 1995 
 Cunningham, John. Hungarian Cinema: From Coffee House to Multiplex. Wallflower Press, 2004.

External links

1932 films
Hungarian crime films
1930s Hungarian-language films
Films based on works by Gaston Leroux
Films directed by Steve Sekely
Aviation films
Films based on French novels
Hungarian multilingual films
1932 crime films
Hungarian black-and-white films
1932 multilingual films